Star Trek: Nero is a four-issue comic book prequel to the 2009 film Star Trek and sequel of the previous book Star Trek: Countdown, both by IDW Publishing. It follows the character of the Romulan Nero and his crew in the time between the destruction of the USS Kelvin and the kidnapping of Spock.

2009 comics debuts
Comics based on Star Trek
Prequel comics
Fiction set in the 24th century